This was the first edition of the tournament.

Hsieh Cheng-peng and Peng Hsien-yin won the title after defeating Sriram Balaji and Vishnu Vardhan 4–6, 6–4, [10–4] in the final.

Seeds

Draw

References
 Main Draw

China International Challenger Jinan - Doubles
2017 Doubles